Rozwadów is a former town, now a suburb of Stalowa Wola, in south-east Poland.

Rozwadów may also refer to the following villages:
Rozwadów, Lublin Voivodeship (east Poland)
Rozwadów, Masovian Voivodeship (east-central Poland)